GVA may refer to:
 Generalitat Valenciana
 General visceral afferent fibers
 Generic Vehicle Architecture, a military vehicle standard of the British Ministry of Defence
 Geneva Airport, in Switzerland
 Garibaldi Volcanic Arc, in British Columbia, Canada
 Gloucestershire Volunteer Artillery, of the Royal Artillery
 Granite Construction, an American construction company
 Grapevine virus A
 Greater Vancouver Area, British Columbia, Canada
 Greg Van Avermaet, a Belgian professional road bicycle racer
 Gross value added, an economic measure
 Gun Violence Archive
 GVA Consultants, a Swedish company 
 GVA (Gazet van Antwerpen)
 Gigavolt-ampere, a billion volt-amperes